Mario Roberto Viera Gil (born 19 October 1959) is a Uruguayan football manager and former player who played as a goalkeeper. He is the current manager of Peruvian club Carlos A. Mannucci.

Career
Born in Florida, Viera only represented clubs in his home nation as a player, notably being a part of the Bella Vista squad who featured in the 1981 Copa Libertadores. After retiring, he was named Gerardo Pelusso's assistant at Everton de Viña del Mar.

In 2000, after a year as an assistant at Independiente Petrolero, Viera made his managerial debut while in charge of Chinese club Tianjin Lifei in the China League Two. He returned to his hometown in 2001 to manage Atlético Florida, but was later in charge of another Chinese club, Tianjin Mingte, in 2002.

Viera returned to work as an assistant of Pelusso at Cerro, Danubio and Alianza Lima before being appointed manager of Universidad César Vallejo in 2008. He left the club in 2010, and was named at the helm of Unión Comercio in 2012.

On 14 December 2012, Viera was appointed manager of Cienciano. He left the club on 13 May 2014, and spent more than a year without a club before taking over Comerciantes Unidos.

Viera opted to leave Comerciantes on 27 December 2016, and took over Sport Boys four days later. He was sacked on 1 March 2018, he was named at the helm of Ayacucho on 6 June.

On 28 November 2019, Viera left Ayacucho to join Carlos A. Mannucci as a sporting director. On 26 May 2021, he returned to the manager duties after being appointed at Universidad Técnica de Cajamarca.

On 13 November 2021, Viera was appointed manager of Alianza Atlético for the 2022 season. He left on 4 November 2022, and returned to Mannucci the following day.

Honours
Sport Boys
Peruvian Segunda División: 2017

References

External links
 

1959 births
Living people
People from Florida Department
Uruguayan footballers
Association football goalkeepers
C.A. Bella Vista players
Racing Club de Montevideo players
Miramar Misiones players
Uruguayan football managers
Peruvian Primera División managers
Club Deportivo Universidad César Vallejo managers
Cienciano managers
Sport Boys managers
Carlos A. Mannucci managers
Universidad Técnica de Cajamarca managers
Alianza Atlético managers
Uruguayan expatriate football managers
Uruguayan expatriate sportspeople in China
Uruguayan expatriate sportspeople in Peru
Expatriate football managers in China
Expatriate football managers in Peru
Unión Comercio managers
Ayacucho FC managers